The King of Paris is a 1930 German comedy film directed by Leo Mittler and starring Iván Petrovich, Hanna Ralph and Hans Peppler. Leo Mittler also directed a separate French-language The King of Paris.

Cast

See also
 The King of Paris (1923 film)

References

Bibliography

External links 
 

1930 films
1930 comedy films
German comedy films
French comedy films
Films of the Weimar Republic
1930s German-language films
Films based on French novels
Films based on works by Georges Ohnet
Films directed by Leo Mittler
German multilingual films
German black-and-white films
Remakes of French films
Sound film remakes of silent films
Bavaria Film films
1930 multilingual films
Films scored by Walter Goehr
1930s German films
1930s French films